Run From the Morning is an Australian thriller television series. Its six episodes were first broadcast on the ABC in September–October 1978.

References

External links
 

Australian drama television series
1978 Australian television series debuts
Australian Broadcasting Corporation original programming